Petroupoli (meaning "City/town of Peter") is a town in Attica that falls under the administrative sector of West Athens. Petroupoli was part of the community of Nea Liosia until 1946, when it became a separate community. It was elevated to municipality status in 1972.

Geography

Petroupoli is situated in the eastern foothills of the Egaleo mountain, 7 km northwest of Athens. The municipality has an area of 6.597 km2. Its main streets (25 March Ave., Anatolikis Romylias St. and Perikleous St.) connect the town with Ilion and Peristeri.

ASDA (Association for the Development of Western Athens) regards Petroupoli as the most developed town in the administrative sector of West Athens .

Culture and education

The Petra Festival takes place every summer. The area's junior football (soccer) team is named Aris Petroupoli.

The traditional festival of the church in the upper city dedicated to the prophet Elias is usually organized around July in the playground of Profitis Elias, folk music and dances are practiced in it along with other activities such as grilled meat selling. 

Petroupoli incorporates a number of private and 15 public kindergartens, 12 primary schools (11 public and 1 private), 6 public lower secondary schools (gymnasia), 5 public upper secondary schools (lyceums) and one public Technical Secondary School (EPAL).

Historical population

References

External links
  Municipality of Petroupoli
  News Blog City Guide of Petroupoli
  Facebook Community page

Municipalities of Attica
Populated places in West Athens (regional unit)